Honhui Plaza is a shopping center in Xinzhuang District, New Taipei, Taiwan that opened on September 26, 2020. It is the largest shopping mall in the district.

History
 March 31, 2017: Groundbreaking ceremony was held.
 March 29, 2019: The beam raising ceremony was held.
 July 31, 2020: Honhui Plaza began trial operation.
 September 26, 2020: Honhui Plaza officially opened.

Floor Guide

See also
 List of tourist attractions in Taiwan

References

External links

2020 establishments in Taiwan
Shopping malls in New Taipei
Shopping malls established in 2020